The José María Castañé Foundation (Fundación José María Castañé) is a Spanish cultural private institution dedicated to historic documents and research. It was founded in 2004 by José María Castañé, a Spanish entrepreneur.

Declaration and principles
 To preserve, restore, classify and catalogue its own documents
 To deepen knowledge about the 20th century through its collections
 To exhibit, project and expand its collections

Archive 

In 2016 the Foundation donated part of its archive to the University of Harvard

References

External links
 Official website of the Fundación José María Castañé

Jose Maria Castane Foundation
Jose Maria Castane Foundation
Organizations established in 2004